Anne Marie DeLuise is a Canadian actress.

Career
DeLuise has had a number of supporting roles in film and television. Her most notable roles are Dr. Greene in Fifty Shades of Grey and Mrs. Briggs on Strange Empire, a role which won her a Leo Award.

Personal life
DeLuise is from St. John's, Newfoundland and Labrador, Canada. She is married to American actor and television director Peter DeLuise. They have one child.

Filmography

 Family Pictures (1993)
 Kung Fu: The Legend Continues episode "Tournament" (1994)
 Janek: The Silent Betrayal (1994)
 Jungleground (1995)
 Darkman II: The Return of Durant (1995)
 Side Effects episode "Leave My Bum Alone" (1995)
 Goosebumps episode "The Haunted Mask: Part 1 & 2" (1995)
 Iron Eagle IV (1995)
 Christmas in My Hometown (1996)
 F/X: The Series episode "Get Fast" (1997)
 Eerie, Indiana: The Other Dimension episode "Young and the Twitchy" (1998)
 Reluctant Angel (1998)
 Sweet Deception (1998)
 Highlander: The Raven episode "Cloak & Dagger" (1998)
 Earth: Final Conflict episodes "Isabel" and "Atavus" (1998)
 Total Recall 2070 (1999)
 Due South (1997-1999)
 Black Light (1998)
 Sweet Lies (1999)
  (1999)
 A Song From The Heart (1999)
 Code Name Eternity (1999)
 Y2K (1999)
 Quarantine (1999)
 First Wave episode "Night Falls" (2000)
 Seven Days episode "Rhino" (2000)
 Big Sound episode "You Bet Your Ass" (2000)
 Higher Ground (2000)
 Life-Size (2000)
 Stargate SG-1 episode "The Other Side" (2000)
 The Chris Isaak Show episode "Tomorrowland" (2001)
 The Outer Limits episode "Rule of Law" (2001)
 Mysterious Ways episode "Friends in Need" (2002)
 Just Deal episode "Happy Medium" (2002)
 The Twilight Zone episode "Future Trade" (2002)
 The Dead Zone episode "The Storm" (2003)
 Jinnah - On Crime: White Knight, Black Widow (2003)
 NTSB: The Crash of Flight 323 (2004)
 Andromeda episode "Trusting the Gordian Maze" and "Pitiless as the Sun" (2001–2004)
 The Collector episode "The Prosecutor" (2004)
 Dead Like Me episode "Haunted" (2004)
 Supernatural episode "Bugs" (2005)
 Engaged to Kill (2006)
 Shock to the System (2006)
 Psych episode "Woman Seeking Dead Husband: Smokers Okay, No Pets" (2006)
 Black Christmas (2006)
 Stargate SG-1 episode "Bounty" (2007)
 Painkiller Jane episode "Nothing to Fear But Fear Itself" (2007)
 Sabbatical (2007)
 Ace of Hearts (2008)
 Smile of April (2009)
 Charly (2009)
 The Thaw (2009)
 Fear Island (2009)
 The Troop episode "Do the Worm" (2009)
 Love Happens (2009)
 Sanctuary episode "Fragments" (2009)
 Frankie & Alice (2010)
 Pretty Little Liars episode "Pilot" (2010)
 Smallville (2006–2011)
 R.L. Stine's The Haunting Hour episode "My Sister the Witch" (2011)
 The Edge of the Garden (2011)
 Om Inc. (2011)
 Strange Empire 12 episodes (2014–2015)
 iZombie (2015)
 Fifty Shades of Grey (2015)
 When Calls the Heart 2 episodes (2016)

Awards and nominations

References

External links
 
 

Living people
Year of birth missing (living people)
Actresses from Newfoundland and Labrador
Canadian film actresses
Canadian television actresses
DeLuise family
People from St. John's, Newfoundland and Labrador